Melville Arthur Leslie Morris (8 June 1895 – 3 May 1956) was an Australian rules footballer who played in the VFL between 1921 and 1926 for the Richmond Football Club. He was Captain/Coach of Richmond for the 1926 season.

Morris was also a pioneer football commentator with the Australian Broadcasting Company and later the Australian Broadcasting Commission.

References 
Hogan P: The Tigers Of Old, Richmond FC, Melbourne 1996

1895 births
1956 deaths
Australian rules footballers from Melbourne
Australian Rules footballers: place kick exponents
Richmond Football Club players
Richmond Football Club Premiership players
Richmond Football Club coaches
One-time VFL/AFL Premiership players
People from St Kilda, Victoria
People educated at Wesley College (Victoria)